UEFA Champions League 2008 may refer to:

UEFA Champions League 2007-08
UEFA Champions League 2008-09